The Distributed European Infrastructure for Supercomputing Applications (DEISA) was a European Union supercomputer project. A consortium of eleven national supercomputing centres from seven European countries promoted pan-European research on European high-performance computing systems. By extending the European collaborative environment in the area of supercomputing, DEISA followed suggestions of the European Strategy Forum on Research Infrastructures.

History
The DEISA project started as DEISA1 in 2002 developing and supporting a pan-European distributed high performance computing infrastructure. The initial project was funded by the European Commission in the sixth of the Framework Programmes for Research and Technological Development (FP6) from 2004 through 2008. The funding continued for the follow-up project DEISA2  in the Seventh Framework Programme (FP7) through 2011.

The DEISA infrastructure coupled eleven national supercomputing centres with a dedicated (mostly 10 Gbit/s) network connection provided by GÉANT2 on the European level and the national research and education networks (NRENs).

Consortium
There were 11 principal partners and four associate partners.

Principal partners were:

 Max Planck Gesellschaft, Germany
 Bavarian Academy of Sciences and Humanities, Germany
 Barcelona Supercomputing Center, Spain
 CINECA, Italy
 CSC, Scientific Computing Ltd, Finland
 European Centre for Medium-Range Weather Forecasts, United Kingdom
 Jülich Research Centre, Germany
  (CNRS), France
 Stichting Academisch Rekencentrum Amsterdam, Netherlands
 Edinburgh Parallel Computing Centre, United Kingdom
 High Performance Computing Center Stuttgart (HLRS), University of Stuttgart, Germany

Associate partners were:

 CEA, Computing Complex, Bruyères-le-Châtel, France
 JSCC, Joint Supercomputer Center of the Russian Academy of Sciences, Moscow
 Swiss National Supercomputing Centre (CSCS), Manno, Switzerland
 The Royal Institute of Technologies - Center for Parallel Computers, (KTH), Stockholm, Sweden

In 2011 services were taken over by the Partnership for Advanced Computing in Europe.

DEISA Benchmark Suite
DEISA produced a benchmark suite to help computer scientists assess the performance of parallel supercomputer systems. The benchmark comprises a number of real applications codes taken from a wide range of scientific disciplines. A structured framework allows compilation, execution and analysis to be configured and carried out via standard input files.

The codes were chosen as representative of the scientific projects performed on the DEISA supercomputers. The codes and associated datasets were selected for benchmarking systems with peak performances ranging up to hundreds of teraflops, machines which are more powerful than a desktop personal computer by factors of tens of thousands.

The suite contained codes relevant to astrophysics, fluid dynamics, climate modelling, biosciences, materials science, fusion power and fundamental particle physics. It has been run by DEISA on a range of its own supercomputers and records of the results are kept for comparison. The DEISA benchmark was used by the EU-funded PRACE project as a starting point for their investigations of benchmarks for the next generation of petaflop supercomputers.

References

Information technology organizations based in Europe
Supercomputing in Europe